Randy Weston was a member of the Ohio House of Representatives from 1991 to 1999. His district consisted of a portion of Crawford County, Ohio, Wyandot County, Ohio, Marion County, Ohio, and Seneca County, Ohio. Weston won all five of his elections to the House of Representatives successively and within a nine-year span. He was succeeded by Bob Gooding, who was appointed to the position after Weston resigned to accept another position. The next individual to win the seat in election was Steve Reinhard.

References

Living people
Year of birth missing (living people)
Democratic Party members of the Ohio House of Representatives